KMXF (101.9 FM) is a radio station licensed to Lowell, Arkansas serving the Fayetteville, Arkansas area. The station airs a top 40 (CHR) music format.

Former logo

References

External links
https://hot1019nwa.iheart.com/

MXF
Contemporary hit radio stations in the United States
Radio stations established in 1992
1986 establishments in Arkansas
IHeartMedia radio stations